Le Chasseron is a mountain in the Jura Mountains, overlooking Sainte-Croix in the canton of Vaud. It has an elevation of 1,607 metres above sea level and is amongst the most isolated mountains of Switzerland.

See also
List of mountains of Switzerland

References

External links

Le Chasseron on Hikr

Mountains of Switzerland
Mountains of the canton of Vaud
Mountains of the Jura
Chasseron